Gračišče (Gracischie in Italian) is a village in the City Municipality of Koper in the Littoral region of Slovenia.

The local church is dedicated to Saint Nicholas and belongs to the Parish of Kubed.

Gallery

References

External links

Gračišče on Geopedia

Populated places in the City Municipality of Koper